Muslim philosophers both profess Islam and engage in a style of philosophy situated within the structure of the Arabic language and Islam, though not necessarily concerned with religious issues. The sayings of the companions of Muhammad contained little philosophical discussion. In the eighth century, extensive contact with the Byzantine Empire led to a drive to translate philosophical works of Ancient Greek Philosophy (especially the texts of Aristotle) into Arabic.

The ninth-century Al-Kindi is considered the founder of Islamic peripatetic philosophy (800–1200). The tenth century philosopher al-Farabi contributed significantly to the introduction of Greek and Roman philosophical works into Muslim philosophical discourse and established many of the themes that would occupy Islamic philosophy for the next centuries; in his broad-ranging work, his work on logic stands out particularly. In the eleventh century, Ibn Sina, one of the greatest Muslim philosophers ever, developed his own unique school of philosophy known as Avicennism which had strong Aristotelian and Neoplatonist roots. Al-Ghazali, a famous Muslim philosopher and theologian, took the approach to resolving apparent contradictions between reason and revelation. He understood the importance of philosophy and developed a complex response that rejected and condemned some of its teachings, while it also allowed him to accept and apply others. It was al-Ghazali's acceptance of demonstration (apodeixis) that led to a much more refined and precise discourse on epistemology and a flowering of Aristotelian logic and metaphysics in Muslim theological circles. Averroes, the last notable Muslim peripatetic philosopher, defended the use of Aristotelian philosophy against this charge; his extensive works include noteworthy commentaries on Aristotle. In the twelfth century, the philosophy of illumination was founded by Shahab al-Din Suhrawardi. Although philosophy in its traditional Aristotelian form fell out of favor in much of the Arab world after the twelfth century, forms of mystical philosophy became more prominent.

After Averroes, a vivid peripatetic philosophical school persisted in the eastern Muslim world during the Safavid Empire which scholars have termed as the School of Isfahan. It was founded by the Shia philosopher Mir Damad and developed further by Mulla Sadra and others.

List

See also
Lists of philosophers
Islamic philosophy
Early Islamic philosophy
Contemporary Islamic philosophy
Islamic scholars
List of Iranian philosophers

Notes

External links
 Islamic Philosophy Online
 Journal of Islamic Philosophy

Footnotes

References
 

Philosophers
Muslim